Champagnegaloppen is a 1938 Danish musical film directed by George Schnéevoigt. The film based on a musical by Hans Christian Lumbye and play by Paul Holck-Hofmann and stars Svend Methling and Valdemar Møller. It is named after the light classical piece composed by Hans Christian Lumbye, who is a character in the film.

Cast
Svend Methling as  H.C. Lumbye 
Valdemar Møller as  Tobias Hambroe 
Agnes Rehni as Abelone Hambroe 
Annie Jessen as Amelie Hambroe 
Marius Jacobsen as Musiker Jens Werning
Victor Montell as Musiker Køster 
John Price as Musiker Lindemann 
Johannes Poulsen as  Koncertmester Salomon Bierbaum 
Eigil Reimers as Baron von Listow 
Torkil Lauritzen. as Løjtnant Seefeld 
Gunnar Helsengreenas  Opvartersken Lene 
Else Højgaard as  Danserinden Arabella 
Helga Frier as  Frk. Züberlein

External links
 

1938 films
1938 musical films
1930s Danish-language films
Danish musical films
Films directed by George Schnéevoigt
Danish black-and-white films